Alice Lake Provincial Park is a provincial park in British Columbia, Canada.

History
Alice Lake is named for the wife of Charles Rose, who settled in the district about 1888. Although the area was used for logging from the 1880s until the 1920s, Alice Lake and the surrounding area has been a popular recreation destination since the area was settled. The park was established on November 23, 1956, and was expanded on 14 February 1961 to cover 396 ha. It was again expanded on 20 October 2009 with an additional 15 ha to increase the park to its current size of 411 ha.

Geography

Alice Lake Provincial Park is home to four freshwater lakes, those being Alice, Edith, Fawn, and Stump Lakes. The park also hosts a large hill, DeBeck's Hill, that offers views of the Tantalus Range and Mt. Garibaldi.

Ecology

The park is home to a number of mammal species, including squirrels, chipmunks, and raccoons. Bird species that call the park home include Stellar's jays, crows, ospreys, and great blue herons. Although not inside the park, the Brackendale bald eagle colony is very close to Alice Lake and eagles from there can often be seen in the park. Marine life in and around the lakes include introduced red-eared slider turtles, and native rainbow, Dolly Varden, and cutthroat trout. Trees include Douglas-fir, cedar, and hemlock.

Recreation

The park's namesake, Alice Lake, is popular as a swimming spot, as it boasts two beaches and a nearby campground with showers and electricity. There are multiple trails crossing the park for hiking and mountain biking, with DeBeck's Hill being a popular trail for its views of the park and surrounding area. Canoeing and fishing are permitted on all four lakes. The park also offers interpretation and education programs for visitors.

References 
Christie, J., & Canadian Electronic Library. (2009). The Whistler book : an all-season outdoor guide / Jack Christie. (Expanded & updated.). Greystone Books.

Bowers, D., & Epting, B. (1972). Exploring Garibaldi Park / text: Dan Bowers ; photography: Dan Bowers & Bernie Epting. Gundy's & Bernie's Guide Books.  

Seagrave, J. (2015). Camping with Kids in the West. Heritage House Publishing.

External links
Alice Lake Provincial Park
Alice Lake Factpage
Vancouver Trails: Alice Lake

Provincial parks of British Columbia
Sea-to-Sky Corridor
1956 establishments in British Columbia